Much TV is a satellite cable channel operated by Era Television in Taiwan, launched on March 15, 1994 (as 歡樂無線台).

External links
 Much TV official website

Television stations in Taiwan
Television channels and stations established in 1994